Gampola fasciata is a moth of the family Erebidae. It was described by Frederic Moore in 1878. It is found in Sri Lanka.

Description
The wingspan of the male is about 28 mm and the  female's is 34 mm. Male has brownish fuscous and anal tuft ochreous. Costa and forewing apex is ochreous. Hindwings pale. Female has indistinct angled fuscous band just beyond the middle of forewing. There are some dark marks can be seen on outer margin.

References

External links
 

Lithosiina
Moths described in 1878